Dangsan Station is an elevated station on the Seoul Subway Line 2 and is an underground station on the Seoul Subway Line 9. The station is located on the south bank of the Han River in Yeongdeungpo-gu. Because the station is elevated, trains exiting to or entering from the north make use of the Dangsan Railway Bridge. As of April 2009, the platform has been outfitted with platform screen doors. Dangsan station is currently a transfer point between Line 2 and Seoul Subway Line 9. Several Korean TV series were shot in nearby locations, like Boys Over Flowers, Iris or My Girlfriend is a Gumiho.

Seoul Subway Line 2 has two-sided relative platforms, Seoul Subway Line 9 has two island platforms, and both platforms have screen doors.

References

Railway stations opened in 1984
Seoul Metropolitan Subway stations
Metro stations in Yeongdeungpo District
1984 establishments in South Korea
20th-century architecture in South Korea